Tapash Baisya (born 25 December 1982) is a former Bangladeshi international cricketer.

Tapash Baisya took 36 Test wickets, although they came at a bowling average of nearly 60. Nevertheless, he has taken the third-most wickets of any Bangladeshi fast bowler, behind Mashrafe Mortaza and Shahadat Hossain. He took four wickets in a Test innings only once: four for 72 against West Indies on their 2002–03 tour of Bangladesh. With the bat he scored two Test fifties.

He played first-class cricket for Sylhet Division from 2000–01 to 2012–13. His highest score was 112 off 173 balls, batting at number eight against Chittagong Division in 2006–07. His best bowling figures were 6 for 37 against Dhaka Division in 2012–13.

Personal life
Tapash moved to the US during 2016 with his wife and two kids. Later his wife gave birth another baby girl. Currently he is playing professional cricket for a team in the United States of America in New Jersey. He is also a cricket coach who teaches many young kids in bat and ball.

References

External links
 

1982 births
Living people
Bangladesh One Day International cricketers
Bangladesh Test cricketers
Bangladeshi cricketers
Bangladeshi Hindus
Bangladeshi emigrants to the United States
Sylhet Division cricketers
Rangpur Riders cricketers
Cricketers at the 2003 Cricket World Cup
People from Sylhet
Abahani Limited cricketers
Prime Bank Cricket Club cricketers
ICL Bangladesh XI cricketers
Dhaka Warriors cricketers
Bangladesh East Zone cricketers
Dhaka Division cricketers